Jean-Pascal Chaigne (born 1977) is a French composer.

Following initial studies at the Conservatoire National de Région de Tours and the University of Tours, he was admitted to the Conservatoire de Paris where he obtained first prizes in analysis, harmony, orchestration, counterpoint, 20th century music writing and composition, studying with Emmanuel Nunes and Stefano Gervasoni. Holding a PhD in musicology and author of several analytical articles, Jean-Pascal Chaigne also conducts research activity, thus nourishing his reflexion on musical creation. After teaching in the universities of Nice and Saint-Etienne, at the conservatory of Annecy and then at the Haute Ecole de Musique de Genève (Geneva University of Music), he is now professor and researcher at the Haute Ecole de Musique Vaud Valais Fribourg (Lausanne Conservatory).

Works

Solo instrument 
 De miroir, d’absence (2016) for viola da gamba
 L'énigme et son sommeil (2011, after Kardia by Claude Royet-Journoud) for soprano
 L'épaisseur d'un cri (2012) for traverso (baroque flute)
 Hymne I (2010) for flute
 Hymne II (2013) for percussion
 Objets I (2007) for bass clarinet
 Soit donc cela I (2013) for harpsichord
 Soit donc cela II (2013) for organ
 Trace (2014) for double bass
 Vertical et blanc I (2006-revised 2009) for cello
 Vertical et blanc II (2009) for viola
 Vertical et blanc III (2009-revised 2011) for violin
 Wie ein Toter (2013) for cello

Chamber ensemble 
 ...an die Nacht I (2013) for solo flute, string trio, piano and percussion
 Aux limites sourdes (2015) for solo violin, percussion and three female voices
 Césure : le corps (2010, after a poem by Anne-Marie Albiach) for mezzo-soprano and violin
 Dans la ligne des paupières (2013, after a poem by Anne-Marie Albiach) for soprano and string quartet
 De sa disparition (2013) for female voice, Celtic harp and cello
 Dire I (2013) for two pianos
 Dire II (2014) for clarinet, percussion, piano, violin, viola and cello
 L'élaboration du silence (2012, after a poem by Anne-Marie Albiach) for three female voices or female chorus
 Entaille for string quartet (2015)
 Hymne III  (in progress) for piano and percussion
 Hymne V  (2018) for piccolo and xylophone
 Hymne VI  (2010) for flute, piano and percussion
 Immer wieder Angst (2016, after Kafka) for soprano, flute, clarinet, violin, cello and piano
 Objets II (2008) for cello octet
 Objets III - L'amant et l'image (2012, after a poem by Claude Royet-Journoud) for mezzo-soprano, flute, guitar, percussion and violin 
 Objets IV (2011) for saxophone quartet
 Reflet for clarinet, violin and cello (2014)
 Répétition (2004- revised 2010, after a poem by Anne-Marie Albiach) for mezzo-soprano, string trio and harpsichord
 Strates (2010, after a poem by Anne-Marie Albiach) for mezzo-soprano, viola, cello and harpsichord
 Trois mouvements for string quartet (2009)
 La voix extrême la lumière (2010, after a poem by Anne-Marie Albiach) for mezzo-soprano, cello and harpsichord

Orchestra / Vocal ensemble 
 ...an die Nacht II (2013, after a poem by Novalis) for solo percussionist, four percussionists and mixed choir
 Der Bau (2011), monodrama for narrator, vocal sextet and orchestra, from the Franz Kafka's novella Der Bau
 L'élaboration du silence (2012, after a poem by Anne-Marie Albiach) for three female voices or female choir
 Figurations (2009) for string trio and chamber orchestra
 Figuration I (2007) for cello and chamber orchestra
 Figuration III / La trajectoire du souffle (2011) for violin and large orchestra
 Ma voix te suit (2011, after Kardia by Claude Royet-Journoud) for a cappella choir (SATB)
 Shlof (2015) for vocal sextet, after a Yiddish lullaby; excerpt from the monodrama Der Bau
 Ludwig van Beethoven Sonate 15 opus 28 n°1 (2003) [orchestration] for orchestra
 Arnold Schönberg Three pieces opus 11 n°1 (2004) [orchestration] for large orchestra
 Arnold Schönberg Three pieces opus 11 n°2 (2005) [orchestration] for large orchestra

Cycles 
 Triptych after Kafka
 Der Bau for narrator, vocal sextet and chamber orchestra
 Immer wieder Angst for soprano, flute, clarinet, violin, cello and piano
 Wie ein Toter for cello
 Le travail du silence cycle (after Roger Giroux):
 L’épaisseur d’un cri, for traverso (baroque flute)
 Soit donc cela I, for harpsichord
 Soit donc cela II, for organ
 De miroir, d’absence, for viola da gamba
 Cet abîme d’étoiles, for theorbo [en cours d’écriture] 
 Objets cycle
 Objets I for bass clarinet
 Objets II for cello octet
 Objets III for mezzo-soprano, flute, guitar, percussion and violin
 Objets IV for saxophone quartet
 Mezza Voce cycle, after Mezza Voce by Anne-Marie Albiach
 Césure :  le corps for mezzo-soprano and violin
 Vertical et blanc I for cello
 La voix extrême la lumière for mezzo-soprano, cello and harpsichord      
 Vertical et blanc II for viola
 Strates for mezzo-soprano, viola, cello and harpsichord
 Vertical et blanc III for violin
 Répétition for mezzo-soprano, string trio and harpsichord
 Kardia diptych, after Kardia by Claude Royet-Journoud
 L'énigme et son sommeil for soprano
 Ma voix te suit for a cappella choir (SATB)
 Hymnes à la nuit cycle, after Hymnen an die Nacht by Novalis
 Hymne I for flute
 Hymne II for percussion
 Hymne III for piano and percussion
 Hymne IV for piano
 Hymne V for flute and percussion
 Hymne VI for flute, piano and percussion
 Les chiffres du corps triptych
 Trace for double bass
 Reflet for clarinet, violin and cello
 Entaille for string quartet

Awards 
 Francis and Mica Salabert Foundation Prize (2009)
 Second Prize of the Mottini Competition 2012 for young composers
 Selected in the Ensemble Aleph’s 7th International Forum in 2014 for his composition Dire II.

Discography
 « Dédicaces » (2010): Jean-Marc Fessard, bass clarinet (Quantum – Codaex); Objets I for bass clarinet is recorded on this CD

External links
 Jean-Pascal Chaigne - Official Web Site
 Jean-Pascal Chaigne - YouTube
  IVe rencontre des doctorants (RITM/CTEL, Université de Nice-Sophia Antipolis), 1er-2 juin 2006

1977 births
21st-century classical composers
University of Tours alumni
Conservatoire de Paris alumni
French classical composers
French male classical composers
Living people
21st-century French composers